Sandidge is a surname. Notable people with the surname include:

John Milton Sandidge (1817–1890), American politician
Tim Sandidge (born 1983), American football player